The Ivory Sands House is a historic house in Cambridge, Massachusetts.  It is a two-story brick structure, five bays wide, with a side-gable roof.  It was built in 1839, and has transitional Federal-Greek Revival styling.  It was the first of four brick houses built by a local family of brickmakers, and is one of the few surviving Federal period brick houses in the city.  The Sands family were involved in Cambridge's brickmaking businesses for most of the 19th century.

The house was listed on the National Register of Historic Places in 1982.

See also
Hiram Sands House
National Register of Historic Places listings in Cambridge, Massachusetts

References

Houses completed in 1839
Houses on the National Register of Historic Places in Cambridge, Massachusetts